Do Rud Mahalleh (also Romanized as Do Rūd Maḩalleh and Dowrūd Maḩalleh; also known as Dar Do Maḩalleh) is a village in Sadan Rostaq-e Sharqi Rural District, in the Central District of Kordkuy County, Golestan Province, Iran. At the 2006 census, its population was 269, in 64 families.

References 

Populated places in Kordkuy County